Zaghel (also Romanized as Zāghel, Zāghal, and Z̄āghel) is a village in Kachu Rural District, in the Central District of Ardestan County, Isfahan Province, Iran. At the 2006 census, its population was 24, in 9 families.

References 

Populated places in Ardestan County